Hiḍimbī (Sanskrit: , IAST: Hiḍimbī), or Hiḍimbā, is the rakshasi wife of the Pandava Bhima and the mother of Ghatotkacha in the  Mahābhārata. She meets Bhima in the 9th sub-parva (Hidimva-vadha Parva) of the Adi Parva. She is also referred to as Bhuṭanadevī or Pallavī.

Hiḍimbi and Bhīma
 
The story begins in the Lākṣāgṛha of the Mahābhārata after the Pāṇḍavās reached a dense forest. Exhausted from their travels, they all fell asleep at night, except for Bhīma who kept watch. 
 
In the same forest lived Hiḍimbi and her brother Hiḍimbā, a very powerful rakshasa. He smelled the Pāṇḍavās at a distance and as usual asked the Hiḍimbī to lure the well-built Bhīma into a trap so he could eat him. Hiḍimbī confronted Bhīma and instead fell in love with him. She assumed the form of a very beautiful lady and approached Bhīma, expressing her desire to marry him by revealing her true identity, as well as her brother's intentions. Bhīma confronted Hiḍimbā, and soon overpowered the rakshasa and slew him. Kuntī and other Pāṇḍavās all watched the duel from a distance.

Marriage
After killing Hiḍimba, Bhīma married Hiḍimbī. Bhīma decided to live with her till a child was born. Hiḍimbī agreed, and they married. Within a year, Hiḍimbī gave birth to a son. They named him Ghaṭotkacha, as his head resembled a pot. Ghaṭotkacha went on to become a great warrior and an important figure in the Mahābhārata war.

Temples

India 
There is a temple in Manali in Himachal Pradesh dedicated to the worship of Hidimbi. According to the legend, Hidimbi stayed back in the forest to perform penance and attain the status of a Goddess.

Nepal 
Bhutandevi Mandir is a Hindu temple dedicated to Goddess Bhutandevi, located in Hetauda in Bagmati Province. The name of the city—Hetauda itself is believed to be derived from the name of the goddess.

Gallery

See also
 Hidimba Devi Temple
 Hidimba
 Kaleshwari Group of Monuments

References

Characters in the Mahabharata
Rakshasa in the Mahabharata
Hindu goddesses